Hylaeus polifolii is a species of hymenopteran in the family Colletidae. It is found in North America.

Subspecies
These two subspecies belong to the species Hylaeus polifolii:
 Hylaeus polifolii catalinensis Cockerell
 Hylaeus polifolii polifolii

References

Further reading

 

Colletidae
Articles created by Qbugbot
Insects described in 1901